Ilarionove is an urban-type settlement in Synelnykove Raion of Dnipropetrovsk Oblast in Ukraine. It is located midway between Dnipro and Synelnykove. Ilarionove hosts the administration of Ilarionove settlement hromada, one of the hromadas of Ukraine. Population:

Economy

Transportation
The settlement has access to Highway M18 connecting Kharkiv with Zaporizhzhia and Melitopol. It is also connected by road with Dnipro.

Ilarionove railway station is on the railway connecting Dnipro and Synelnykove. There is suburban passenger traffic.

References

Urban-type settlements in Synelnykove Raion